Joseph D. Neguse (born May 13, 1984) is an American lawyer and politician serving as the U.S. representative for Colorado's 2nd congressional district since 2019. The district is based in Boulder and includes many of Denver's northwestern suburbs, as well as Fort Collins. A member of the Democratic Party, he was a regent of the University of Colorado from 2008 to 2015. Neguse is the first Eritrean-American elected to the United States Congress and Colorado's first black member of Congress.

Early life
Neguse's parents immigrated to the United States from Eritrea. They met while living in Bakersfield, California, where they married and had Joe and his younger sister. The family moved to Colorado when he was six years old. After living in Aurora, Littleton, and Highlands Ranch, the family settled in Boulder. Neguse graduated from ThunderRidge High School; the University of Colorado Boulder, where he served as student body president, with a bachelor's degree in political science and economics summa cum laude in 2005; and the University of Colorado Law School, with his Juris Doctor in 2009.

Earlier career
While he was a student, Neguse founded New Era Colorado, an organization to get young people involved in politics. He worked at the Colorado State Capitol as an assistant to Andrew Romanoff when Romanoff was a member of the Colorado House of Representatives. In 2008 Neguse was elected to the Regents of the University of Colorado, representing , becoming the second African American in Colorado history to serve on the Board of Regents.

Neguse ran for Secretary of State of Colorado in 2014, losing to Wayne W. Williams, 47.5% to 44.9%. In June 2015, Governor John Hickenlooper appointed Neguse the executive director of the Colorado Department of Regulatory Agencies (DORA), making him one of the youngest state cabinet officials in the country.

At DORA, Neguse led an agency with roughly 600 employees and a $100 million budget charged with protecting consumers across the state by regulating the financial securities and insurance industries.

In 2017, Neguse resigned from DORA to run in the 2018 elections for the United States House of Representatives in Colorado's 2nd congressional district, seeking to succeed Jared Polis, who successfully ran for governor of Colorado. He also joined the law firm Snell & Wilmer, working in administrative law.

U.S. House of Representatives

Elections

2018 

On June 13, 2017, Neguse announced he would run for the Democratic nomination after incumbent U.S. Representative Jared Polis announced he would not run for reelection and would run for governor of Colorado. In the June 26, 2018, Democratic primary—the real contest in this heavily Democratic district—Neguse faced businessman and former Boulder County Democratic Party chairman Mark Williams. Neguse defeated Williams with 65.7% of the vote, winning all 10 counties in the district.

Neguse then defeated the Republican nominee, businessman Peter Yu, in the November 6 general election, receiving 60.2% of the vote, and winning all but two counties. Neguse became the first Black American to represent Colorado in the House.

2020 

He was reelected in 2020 with 61.5% of the vote, defeating Republican Charles Winn.

Tenure
Shortly after his election to the House, Neguse was elected by his House colleagues to serve in House leadership as the Co-Freshman Representative.

Neguse voted for the impeachment of Donald Trump in 2019. In 2020, he was named the most bipartisan member of the Colorado congressional delegation by the Lugar Center.

In November 2020, Neguse's House colleagues unanimously elected him to serve as a co-chair of the Democratic Policy and Communications Committee, the number eight position in House Democratic leadership. In December 2022, he was elected chair, the fifth-highest position in the Democratic Party leadership.

On January 12, 2021, Speaker Pelosi appointed Neguse as a House impeachment manager for Trump's second impeachment trial, making him the youngest impeachment manager in U.S. history. During the trial, Neguse and his fellow House impeachment managers built their case by drawing connections between Trump's claims of election fraud in the 2020 election and the attack on the US Capitol on January 6, 2021. In the end, the Senate voted to acquit Trump, but with seven Republican senators voting to convict, it was the most bipartisan impeachment trial in U.S. history.

Committee assignments
Committee on Natural Resources
Subcommittee on National Parks, Forests and Public Lands
Subcommittee on Water, Oceans and Wildlife
Committee on the Judiciary
Subcommittee on Antitrust, Commercial and Administrative Law (vice chair)
Subcommittee on Immigration and Citizenship (vice chair)
Select Committee on the Climate Crisis

Caucus memberships 

 Congressional Black Caucus
 Congressional Progressive Caucus
 House Gun Violence Prevention Task Force (vice chair)
 Congressional LGBT Equality Caucus
 Congressional Cannabis Caucus
 Medicare for All Caucus

Political positions

Social issues 
Neguse supported the Equality Act. He supports the Voting Rights Act and has introduced legislation to allow people aged 16 and 17 to preregister to vote. He co-sponsored the Emmett Till Antilynching Act. Neguse supports the national legalization of cannabis. Neguse supports universal background checks and believes there are limitations to the Second Amendment.

Climate change 
Neguse has called climate change an "existential threat". He has introduced legislation to create an expansion of the Civilian Conservation Corps to focus on forest management and wildfire mitigation. Neguse opposed the Trump administration's withdrawal from the Paris Agreement. He supports the Green New Deal. He supports efforts to increase fuel efficiency and federal incentives for renewable energy use. Neguse supports endangered wildlife protections, including sponsoring bills to support wildlife protections on the South Platte River. He also wants to expand the size of Arapaho National Forest.

Economic issues 
Neguse opposed the Tax Cuts and Jobs Act of 2017. He opposes increased military spending.

Healthcare 
Neguse supports Medicare for All and universal health care. He also supports mandatory coverage of preexisting conditions and opposes repealing the Affordable Care Act. Neguse supports the national expansion of COVID-19 testing and voted in support of stimulus funding related to the pandemic. He opposed the Trump administration's decision to leave the World Health Organization during the pandemic.

Voting rights 
Neguse supports national mail-in voting. He also supports the Voting Rights Act.

Immigration and criminal justice 
The son of immigrants, Neguse supports immigration reform and serves as the vice chair of the House Judiciary Subcommittee on Immigration and Citizenship. He supports a pathway for citizenship for undocumented immigrants in the U.S. and the DREAM Act. He supports police reform.

Electoral history

Personal life

Neguse is married to Andrea Jimenez Rael. They met in Boulder County. Their daughter was born in August 2018. They live in Lafayette, east of Boulder.

See also
 List of African-American United States representatives

References

External links

 Congressman Joe Neguse official U.S. House website
Joe Neguse for Congress

|-

|-

1984 births
21st-century American politicians
Democratic Party members of the United States House of Representatives from Colorado
African-American members of the United States House of Representatives
American people of Eritrean descent
Living people
Politicians from Bakersfield, California
Politicians from Boulder, Colorado
University of Colorado Law School alumni
21st-century African-American politicians
20th-century African-American people